Krogulec  is a village in the administrative district of Gmina Mysłakowice, within Jelenia Góra County, Lower Silesian Voivodeship, in south-western Poland.

Gallery

References

Krogulec